La Danse: The Paris Opera Ballet is a 2009 French documentary film directed by Frederick Wiseman. Besides aiming to reveal "how the company functions as an organic whole", the film follows the production of seven ballets by the Paris Opera Ballet. The ballets featured are:
 Genus (Wayne McGregor)
 La maison de Bernarda (Mats Ek)
 Le songe de Médée (Angelin Preljocaj)
 Paquita (Pierre Lacotte, after Joseph Mazilier and Marius Petipa)
 Orpheus und Eurydike (Pina Bausch)
 Roméo et Juliette (Berlioz) (Sasha Waltz)
 The Nutcracker (Rudolf Nureyev version) 

The film proceeds without commentary, and there are no voiceovers.

Dancers from the Paris Opera Ballet who appear in the film include the étoiles Kader Belarbi, Jérémie Bélingard, Émilie Cozette, Aurélie Dupont, Mathieu Ganio, Dorothée Gilbert, Marie-Agnès Gillot, Manuel Legris, Nicolas Le Riche, Agnès Letestu, José Martinez, Hervé Moreau, Delphine Moussin, Clairemarie Osta, Benjamin Pech, Laetitia Pujol and Wilfried Romoli, and the premiers danseurs Yann Bridard, Stéphane Bullion, Isabelle Ciaravola, Nolwenn Daniel, Christophe Duquenne, Eve Grinsztajn, Mathias Heymann, Mélanie Hurel, Myriam Ould-Braham, Karl Paquette, Stéphane Phavorin, Stéphanie Romberg, Emmanuel Thibault and Muriel Zusperreguy.

References

External links
 
 

2009 films
2000s French-language films
Documentary films about ballet
Films directed by Frederick Wiseman
French documentary films
2009 documentary films
Paris Opera Ballet
2000s French films